The Ritharnggu language (Ritharrŋu, Ritharngu, Ritarungo) is an Australian Aboriginal language of the Yolŋu language group, spoken in Australia's Northern Territory.

Dialects align with the two kinship moieties of the Ritharrngu people, one of several Yolngu peoples: (a) Ritharnggu (Yirritja moiety), and (b) Wagilak language (Dua moiety).  The Manggurra (the other Dua clan) now speak Ritharnggu, but apparently shifted from Nunggubuyu.

Language revival

, Wägilak/Ritharrŋu is one of 20 languages prioritised as part of the Priority Languages Support Project, being undertaken by First Languages Australia and funded by the Department of Communications and the Arts. The project aims to "identify and document critically-endangered languages — those languages for which little or no documentation exists, where no recordings have previously been made, but where there are living speakers".

References

Yolŋu languages
Endangered indigenous Australian languages in the Northern Territory